Leite ( or ) is a Portuguese and Galician surname (literally Milk) that may refer to:

 Adriano Leite Ribeiro, better known as Adriano (born 1982), Brazilian footballer
 Cláudia Cristina Leite Inácio Pedreira (born 1980), Brazilian singer
 Daniela Leite, (born 1988), Brazilian group rhythmic gymnast
 David Leite (born 1960), Portuguese-American food writer, cookbook author, memoirist, and publisher of the website Leite's Culinaria
 Eduardo Leite (born 1985), Brazilian politician, governor of Rio Grande do Sul
 George Leite (1920-1985), Portuguese-American author, publisher, bookseller, and native plants nursery owner
 Izabelle Leite (born 1990), Brazilian model and Bollywood actress
 José Batista Leite da Silva (born 1979), Brazilian footballer
 José Leite Lopes (1918-2006), Brazilian theoretical physicist in the field of quantum field theory and particle physics
 Ricardo Izecson dos Santos Leite, better known as Kaká (born 1982), Brazilian footballer
 Rodrigo Ifrano dos Santos Leite, better known as Digão (born 1985), Brazilian footballer

See also 
 Leiter
 Leites
 Leitner

Portuguese-language surnames